Farewell to the Shade is the fouth studio album by English band And Also the Trees. It was released in 1989 through record label Reflex.

Background 

Farewell to the Shade was recorded in 1989 at The Abattoir in Birmingham, England.

Release 

Farewell to the Shade was released in 1989 through record label Reflex. According to AllMusic, it was their only US release to date at the time of the review.

Musical style 

Farewell to the Shade has been cited as an example of gothic rock.

Track listing

Personnel 

 Simon Huw Jones – vocals
 Justin Jones – guitar
 Steven Burrows – bass guitar
 Nick Havas – drums
 Mark Tibenham – keyboards

References

External links 

 

1989 albums
And Also the Trees albums